Hungary competed at the 1896 Summer Olympics in Athens, Greece.
Austrian and Hungarian results at early Olympic Games are generally kept separate despite the union of the two nations as Austria-Hungary at the time.

Seven athletes from Hungary competed in six sports.  The Hungarian medals came on 18 entries in 15 events.


Medalists

The following Hungarian competitors won medals at the games. In the discipline sections below, the medalists' names are bolded.

|  style="text-align:left; width:78%; vertical-align:top;"|

|  style="text-align:left; width:22%; vertical-align:top;"|

Multiple medalists
The following competitors won multiple medals at the 1896 Olympic Games.

Competitors

| width=78% align=left valign=top |
The following is the list of number of competitors participating in the Games:

| width="22%" align="left" valign="top" |

Athletics

The Hungarian athletes were successful in each event except the 110 metre hurdles, taking a silver, two bronzes, and a 4th-place finish. The entry and competitor lists for some events are not agreed on by all sources. In the 100 metres, Dáni, Leonidasz Manno, and István Zachar may have entered and not started (or possibly have competed) along with Szokolyi.

Track & road events

Field events

Gymnastics

Artistic

Swimming

Hajós won both events he entered, taking two of the four swimming medals (he could not enter the 100 metres for sailors event, and the 500 metres was immediately after the 100 metres and immediately before the 1200 metres).

Tennis

Tapavicza was defeated by Dionysios Kasdaglis in the semifinals of the singles tournament.

Weightlifting

Wrestling

Notes

References
  (Digitally available at )
  (Excerpt available at )
 

Nations at the 1896 Summer Olympics
1896
Olympics